Res extra commercium (lat. "a thing outside commerce") is a doctrine originating in Roman law, holding that certain things may not be the object of private rights, and are therefore insusceptible to being traded.

In some contexts, it can refer to areas beyond national borders, such as space and the seabed; "these regions are subject to a common freedom of exploitation without exercising national sovereignty."

If one conceives of a world community made up "of sovereign, territorial states ... [the implication is] that the space between these states is res extra commercium, a space that, because of its position and function within this community, is disassociated from the full package of rights to possession, exclusion, and alienation that normally may be claimed by holders of property."

A recent move by Indian Government (February 2018) to curb the $11 billion tobacco industry's legal right to trade, the government, for the first time, has asked the Supreme Court to classify tobacco as “res extra commercium”.  The move is part of the government's effort to tame the tobacco companies looking to challenge tough regulations pertaining to the industry.

References

Legal rules with Latin names
International law